Sulfido refers to the ligand species . There is only one donor atom present in this ligand which is sulfur. It also refers to the ligand or functional group , which is a sulfur atom bonded to the rest of molecule by a single bond, and has a charge of −1.

References 

Ligands